The Lautaro Youth Movement  (or MJL) also known as  MAPU Lautaro was a left-wing armed organization in Chile, founded in 1982 by Guillermo Ossandón.

History
During the Military dictatorship in Chile  some members of the  Popular Unitary Action Movement formed the Movimiento Juvenil Lautaro to pursue guerrilla warfare. The MJL was named after Lautaro, leader of the indigenous resistance in Chile.

MAPU Lautaro continued its armed struggle even after the return of democracy to Chile and democratic elections.

See also
 Armed resistance in Chile (1973–90)
 Apoquindo massacre

References

External links
 MAPU Lautaro documents and statements
 Teoría, identidad y praxis del MAPU-Lautaro

Rebel groups in Chile
Guerrilla movements in Latin America
Defunct communist militant groups
Communist parties in Chile
Military dictatorship of Chile (1973–1990)